The Latin Grammy Award for Album of the Year is an honor presented annually at the Latin Grammy Awards, a ceremony that recognizes excellence and creates a wider awareness of cultural diversity and contributions of Latin recording artists in the United States and internationally. The award is given to the performers, producers, audio engineers and mastering engineers for vocal or instrumental albums with 51 percent of new recorded songs. Albums of previously released recordings, such as reissues, compilations of old recordings and greatest hits albums packages are not eligible. Due to the increasing musical changes in the industry, from 2012 the category includes 10 nominees, according to a restructuration made by the academy for the four general categories: Song of the Year, Record of the Year, Best New Artist and Album of the Year. Beginning in 2018, songwriters are eligible for the accolade if 33% of the playing time are composed by them.

Juan Luis Guerra has won the most awards in the category with four wins (one as a producer). Alejandro Sanz and Juanes have won three times each. They are followed by Calle 13, Luis Miguel and Rosalía with two winning albums. In 2022, Spanish singer-songwriter Rosalía became the first female artist to win the award twice. Meanwhile, Colombian singer-songwriter Shakira was the first female recipient, winning the award in 2006. Most nominated albums were recorded in Spanish language, though Djavan, Chico Buarque, Gilberto Gil, Ivan Lins, Maria Rita, Ivete Sangalo, Tribalistas and Caetano Veloso have been nominated for albums recorded in Portuguese language, with Lins winning the award in 2005 for Cantando Histórias.

Some of the awarded albums have also earned the Grammy Award, such as No Es Lo Mismo and Paraíso Express, recorded by Sanz, La Vida... Es un Ratico and MTV Unplugged Deluxe Edition by Juanes and Vida by Draco Rosa, for Best Latin Pop Album; La Llave de Mi Corazón by Guerra, for Best Traditional Tropical Latin Album; Salsa Big Band by Rubén Blades with Roberto Delgado & Orquesta for Best Tropical Latin Album; Fijación Oral Vol. 1 by Shakira, for Best Latin Rock/Alternative Album; ¡México Por Siempre! by Luis Miguel, for Best Regional Mexican Music Album (including Tejano); Los de Atrás Vienen Conmigo by Calle 13 for Best Latin Urban Album; and El Mal Querer by Rosalía for Best Latin Rock, Urban or Alternative Album.

Miguel Bosé is the most nominated performer without a win, with five unsuccessful nominations. Rafael Arcaute, Eduardo Cabra, Gustavo Santaolalla and René Pérez are the most awarded producers, with two wins each, Ronnie Torres has received the most awards as engineer/mixer, with three wins, and Adam Ayan is the most awarded mastering engineer with three victories as well.

Recipients

2000s

2010s

2020s

See also
 Grammy Award for Album of the Year
 Billboard Latin Music Award for Top Latin Album of the Year

Notes
 Each year is linked to the article about the Latin Grammy Awards held that year.
 Showing the name of the performer, the nominated album and in parentheses the record producer(s), engineers/mixer(s) and mastering engineer(s) name(s).

References

General
  Note: User must select the "General Field" category as the genre under the search feature.

Specific

External links
Official site of the Latin Grammy Awards

 
Album of the Year

vi:Album của năm